Dawsonia is a genus of acrocarpous mosses. Dawsonia, along with other members of the order Polytrichales, are taller than most mosses and have thicker leaves. Their sporophytes have conducting systems analogous to those of vascular plants. Dawsonia superba is found in New Zealand, Australia and New Guinea. D. longifolia is found in the Philippines, Indonesia, Malaysia, and Australia. There is uncertainty as to whether D. superba and D. longifolia are actually distinct species.

Etymology 
Dawsonia was named in honor of Dawson Turner (1775–1858), distinguished cryptogamist and friend of Robert Brown, who named the genus in 1811.

Description

Height 
Moss gametophytes lack internal transport tissues, which, coupled with the absence of cuticles, leads to the water-loss characteristic of bryophytes. As bryophytes can only grow when hydrated, the lack of conducting tissue restricts most mosses, even in relatively wet habitats, to a low stature.

However, Dawsonia (along with other genera in the Polytrichales order) reaches heights comparable to those of vascular plants. Polytrichales are acrocarpous mosses – they have vertical stems with terminal reproductive structures, with the sporophyte growing vertically (along the same axis as the gametophyte stem).

Leaves 
The leaves of Polytrichum and Dawsonia (and related moss) differ from those of most mosses, which are only one or two cells thick. The Polytrichaceae have lamellae – upright sheets of small, photosynthetic cells on the upper surface of the leaves with a function analogous to the mesophyll cells of vascular plant leaves. They increase the surface area of cell walls available for CO2 uptake, while at the same time maintaining layers of moist air between lamellae, reducing water loss. Lamella margins have a surface wax layer which prevents water from flooding into the interlamellar spaces.

Stems 

The stems of Polytrichales have conducting systems which are analogous to the xylem and phloem of vascular plants. The water-conducting tissue is the hydrome, made up of elongated cells known as hydroids. Unlike the xylem of vascular plants, there is no secondary thickening of cell walls, as bryophytes lack lignin. The phloem analogue in Polytrichales is the leptome, made up of leptoids, they are similar to sieve cells. Hydrome and leptome are well-developed in Polytrichales, and also appear in a number of other bryophytes.

References

External links 

 Interactive, virtual slide cross-section of Dawsonia

Polytrichaceae
Moss genera